Kadapra is a beautiful place in Koipuram Panchayath of Pathanamthitta District, Kerala, India. The main attraction of Kadapra is the "Varaal Chaal" which is a paradise of most delicious fishes and aquatic species. Other attractions of Kadapra are the Public Library, 100 Years Old MTLP School, Malanada Temple, and many churches.

References 

Villages in Pathanamthitta district